Peter Medak (born Medák Péter, 23 December 1937) is a Hungarian-born film director and television director of British and American productions.

Early life
Born in Budapest, Hungary, he was the son of Elisabeth (née Diamounstein) and Gyula Medak, a textile manufacturer. His family was Jewish. In 1956, he fled his native country for the United Kingdom due to the Hungarian Uprising. There he embarked on a career in the film industry, starting as a trainee and gradually rising to the position of film director.

Career
Medak was signed to direct television films for MCA Universal Pictures in 1963. In 1967, he signed with Paramount Pictures to make feature films. His first such film was Negatives (1968).

Some of his most notable other works are The Ruling Class (1972), The Changeling (1980), The Krays (1990) and Let Him Have It (1991).

Medak has also directed a number of TV episodes and films, including The Feast of All Saints (a mini-series), Homicide: Life on the Street, The Wire and Carnivàle.

Personal life
His marriage to his first wife, Katherine LaKermance, with whom he had two children, ended when she died in London in 1972. He had two further children with his second wife, British actress Carolyn Seymour, from whom he was later divorced. Medak's third wife was opera singer Julia Migenes; the marriage lasted from 1988 to 2003.

Partial filmography

 Negatives (1968)
 A Day in the Death of Joe Egg (1972)
 The Ruling Class (1972)
 The Third Girl From the Left (1973)
 Ghost in the Noonday Sun (1974)
 The Odd Job (1978)
 The Changeling (1980)
 The Babysitter (1980)
 Zorro, The Gay Blade (1981)
 Cry for the Strangers (1982)
 Hart to Hart (1982)
 Faerie Tale Theatre (1984)
 Episode 3.03 "Pinocchio"
 Episode 3.05 "Snow White and the Seven Dwarves"
 Episode 4.02 "The Snow Queen"
 Episode 4.07 "The Emperor's New Clothes"
 Episode 6.03 "The Dancing Princesses"
 The Twilight Zone (1985)
 Episode 1.09 "Dead Woman's Shoes"
 The Men's Club (1986)
 The Metamorphosis, a Study: Nabokov on Kafka (1989)
 The Krays (1990)
 Let Him Have It (1991)
 Romeo Is Bleeding (1993)
 Pontiac Moon (1994)
 The Hunchback (1997)
 Species II (1998)
 David Copperfield (2000)
 The Feast of All Saints (2001) (TV mini-series)
 Masters of Horror (2007)
 Episode "The Washingtonians"
 The Wire (2002)
 Episode 1.03 "The Buys"
Carnivàle (2003)
 Episode 1.04 "Black Blizzard"
 House (2004)
 Episodes 1.6 "The Socratic Method"Sex and Lies in Sin City (2008)Breaking Bad (2009)
 Episode 2.06 "Peekaboo"Hannibal (2013)
 Episode 1.04 "Œuf"
 Episode 2.03 "Hassun"Dating Game Killer (2017)The Ghost of Peter Sellers'' (2018)

References

External links
 
 
 Peter Medak at Britmovie.co.uk

1937 births
English-language film directors
Hungarian emigrants to the United Kingdom
Hungarian emigrants to the United States
Hungarian Jews
Hungarian refugees
People from Budapest
Living people
Science fiction film directors